This is a listing of the horses that finished in either first, second, or third place and the number of starters in the Breeders' Cup Juvenile Fillies Turf, a grade two race run on grass on Friday of the Breeders' Cup World Thoroughbred Championships.

See also 

 Breeders' Cup World Thoroughbred Championships

References
 Breeders' Cup official website

Juvenile
Lists of horse racing results